Erika L. Pearce is an American immunologist. She is the Bloomberg Distinguished Professor at the Johns Hopkins University after serving as director and a scientific member at Max Planck Institute of Immunobiology and Epigenetics in Freiburg, Germany. Her work investigates the connection between metabolism and immune cell function with a particular focus on the regulation of T-cells. In 2018, she was awarded the Leibniz Prize for her "outstanding work in metabolism and inflammation research."

Early life and education
Pearce was born in 1972, and grew up in North Fork, Long Island, New York. She completed her Bachelor of Science degree at Cornell University in 1998 and earned her PhD in cell and molecular biology from the University of Pennsylvania in 2005. While completing her postdoctoral studies at the University of Pennsylvania, Pearce began her research into how cellular metabolic processes govern immune responses to infection and cancer.

Career
Upon completing her postdoctoral studies, Pearce joined the Trudeau Institute in New York City from 2009 until 2011. She left the non-profit in 2011 to become an assistant professor in the Department of Pathology and Immunology at the Washington University School of Medicine (WUSM) in St. Louis. During her tenure at WUSM, Pearce expanded on her earlier research into memory T cells. In 2012, her research team found that the production of additional mitochondria is triggered by interleukin-15. She also found that genetically manipulating T cell's mitochondria could cause a higher percentage of undifferentiated T cells to become memory cells. Pearce and her colleagues also found evidence that suggested cancer cells could disable T cells ability to fight off tumors and some kinds of infection. Her research team found that withholding sugar from T cells, the cells no longer produced interferon gamma. In March 2014, Pearce was promoted to the rank of associate professor of pathology and immunology at WUSM. In her new role, Pearce received two grants to assist her research into cellular metabolism in immunity to infection. She received a grant from the Burroughs Wellcome Fund and the National Cancer Institute of the National Institutes of Health.

Pearce left North America in September 2015 to become the director and a scientific member at Max Planck Institute of Immunobiology and Epigenetics in Freiburg, Germany. In 2018, she was awarded the Leibniz Prize for her "outstanding work in metabolism and inflammation research." Pearce returned to the United States in 2022 to become the Bloomberg Distinguished Professor at Johns Hopkins University.

Publications 
, Pearce has more than 18,000 citations in Google Scholar and an h-index of 49.

Highly cited articles (more than 1000 citations)

See also
 Timeline of women in science

References

External links

Living people
1972 births
20th-century biologists
20th-century American women scientists
21st-century biologists
21st-century American women scientists
American immunologists
Max Planck Society people
Johns Hopkins University faculty
University of Pennsylvania alumni
Washington University School of Medicine faculty
Gottfried Wilhelm Leibniz Prize winners
American women biologists
Women medical researchers
Max Planck Institute directors